Tiruvaneshwar Temple is a Hindu temple located at Ranganathapuram in the Thiruvaiyaru taluk of Thanjavur district in Tamil Nadu. The temple is dedicated to Shiva.

References 
 

Shiva temples in Thanjavur district